Samuel Percy (1750–1820)  was an Irish-born sculptor mainly working as a wax-modeller in England. He has a unique style, creating three dimensional miniature portraits in coloured wax.

Life

He was born and raised in Dublin and trained at the Dublin Society's Schools, exhibiting from 1772. He left Ireland and moved to London around 1785 and lived there for the rest of his life.

He exhibited in the Royal Academy from 1786 to 1804. He died suddenly of apoplexy in 1820.

Works
Abraham offering Isaac (1772)
Portrait of the Emperor and Empress of Russia (1788)
Portrait of Louis XVI
Portrait of King George III (1795) at Windsor Castle
Portrait of Queen Charlotte (1795) at Windsor Castle
Model for Monument to Admiral Nelson (1806)
Portrait of Joshua McGough of Drumsill (1811)
A Woman with Children Gathering Apples at Victoria and Albert Museum
Portrait of Princess Charlotte Augusta of Wales (1814) National Portrait Gallery, London
Portrait of Mrs Elizabeth Best (dnk) at Victoria and Albert Museum
Portrait of Richard Reynolds of Bristol (1817) National Portrait Gallery, London
The Death of Voltaire (dnk)
The Three Musicians (dnk)
Portrait of Lady Barrington (dnk) at Victoria and Albert Museum
Portrait of Sir Arthur Paget (dnk) at Victoria and Albert Museum
Portrait of Sir Charles Morgan at Tredegar Park (dnk)
The Progress of Inebriety (a series of at least three panels)
Frederick the Great in his Last Illness
A Blind Beggar
Dead Christ
Portrait of Count Struensee
Portrait of the Duke of Leeds
Portrait of Judge James Eyre
Portrait of Judge Wilson
Portrait of Lord Romney
Portrait of Lord Kenyon
Portrait of the Duke of Richmond
Portrait of Tom Paine
Portrait of Lord Thurlow
Portrait of the actor John Henderson
Portrait of Lady Menteith
Portrait of General William Haviland
Portrait of Admiral Reddam
Portrait of Lord Rockingham
Portrait of Prince Leopold (1820)

Family

Not known

References
 

1750 births
1830 deaths
People from Dublin (city)
British sculptors